Nampally is one of the biggest City Center of Hyderabad New City, India. It is also a mandal in Hyderabad District. The biggest landmarks are Ibrahim's house and Hyderabad Deccan Station, locally known as the Nampally railway station.

History
Nampally derives its name from a Persian Diwan of Hyderabad, Raza Ali Khan whose title was Nekh-Nam-Khan. A jagir was granted to him, Nekh-Nampally, which became ‘Nampally’. The Nampally Railway Station was built in 1907 by Osman Ali Khan, Asaf Jah VII, the last Nizam of Hyderabad.

The Hyderabad Railway Station, popularly known as "Nampally Station", was used mostly as goods siding while the Secunderabad Railway Station (built in 1874) saw its first train on 9 October 1874 when the Wadi-Secunderabad line was commissioned by the Nizam's Guaranteed State Railway. The Hyderabad Railway Station had to wait till 1921 before the first passenger train came chugging in. The delay was because the Begumpet Railway Station was being constructed, it was discovered that the railway line passed through the property of Viqar-ul-Umra and it was only when he insisted that the trains stop at Begumpet, did he grant permission for full construction of the Begumpet Railway Station. Once It was resolved, trains began plying between Secunderabad and Hyderabad - passing through either the Hussain Sagar Junction or Begumpet Railway Station.

As of today, it has emerged one of the busiest Railway Stations with many Express and Super fast trains terminating or originating from here that include the legendary Telangana Express - the first Super fast train of South Central Railways that runs between Hyderabad and New Delhi - and the Godavari Express and Hussainsagar Express trains.

Landmarks

Dargah Yousufain
AP State Archaeology Museum has antiques dating back to the Nizam period, including an Egyptian mummy
Public Gardens, a recreational spot
Moazzam Jahi Market
Centre for DNA Fingerprinting and Diagnostics
Jubilee Hall
Numaish, Exhibition Grounds
Nampally Sarai
Telangana Board of Intermediate Education

Transport
Nampally is well connected  by road and rail. It is connected by Nampally Metro Station of Hyderabad Metro. Buses run by TSRTC provide connectivity from and to this place. Nampally Railway Station, now known as Hyderabad Station, is Hyderabad's main railway station providing connectivity to various parts of the state and country. MMTS train runs the local city train service from the Nampally railway station providing connectivity to important parts of the city. Autos, taxis and seven seaters all provide a means of transport to different parts of the city.  .

References 

Neighbourhoods in Hyderabad, India